Quintus Herennius Etruscus Messius Decius (died June 251) was briefly Roman emperor in 251, ruling jointly under his father Decius. His father was proclaimed emperor by his troops in September 249 while in Pannonia and Moesia, in opposition to Emperor Philip the Arab. Decius defeated Philip in battle, and was then proclaimed emperor by the Roman Senate. When the Goths, under Cniva, invaded the Danubian provinces, Herennius Etruscus was sent with a vanguard, followed by the main body of Roman troops, led by Decius. They ambushed Cniva at the Battle of Nicopolis ad Istrum in 250, routing him, before being ambushed and routed themselves at the Battle of Beroe. Herennius Etruscus was killed in the Battle of Abritus the following year, alongside his father. After the deaths of both emperors, Trebonianus Gallus, who had been governor of Moesia, was elected emperor by the remaining Roman forces.

Life
Quintus Herennius Etruscus Messius Decius was the son of Decius, a Roman general who later became emperor, and Herennia Etruscilla, his wife. His birth date is sometimes given between 220 and 230, but there is no way to confirm this. Etruscus was probably a young boy when he was proclaimed emperor in 251, as depicted in his coins.

Decius became emperor after being sent to lead troops in the provinces of Pannonia and Moesia, where he was declared emperor by his troops in September 249, in opposition to Philip the Arab. He led his troops against Philip, their forces meeting in September 249, near Verona, Italy. In this battle, Philip was slain, after which the Roman Senate declared Decius emperor, and honored him with the name Traianus, a reference to Emperor Trajan.

He was also made consul for 251.

In 249, the Goths, led by King Cniva, invaded the Danubian provinces of the Roman Empire with a huge force. They split into two columns; one column launched an assault on Dacia, and the other force, made up of 70,000 men, and personally led by Cniva, invaded Moesia. Cniva's forces further split into two groups; one marched to assault Philippopolis, and the other marched to Novae. Cniva was prevented from laying siege to Novae by Trebonianus Gallus, the governor of Moesia and future emperor, and thus moved south, on to Nicopolis. By this time news of the invasion reached Rome, and both Decius and Herennius Etruscus traveled to repulse the Gothic invasion, although Hostilian remained in Rome. Herennius Etruscus was sent forward with a vanguard, followed by the main body of Roman forces, led by Decius. Decius and Herennius Etruscus took the Gothic forces by surprise in the Battle of Nicopolis, and beat them decisively. Following the crushing defeat, Cniva retreated over the Haemus Mons (Balkan Mountains), and met up with his other forces at Philippopolis. Cniva then ambushed the forces of Decius and Herennius Etruscus at the Battle of Beroe, near the small town of Beroca at the base of the Haemus Mons. The Roman forces were beaten decisively in this engagement and fled in disarray to Moesia where Decius and Herennius Etruscus worked to reorganize them. Cniva then returned to Philippopolis, and with the help of Titus Julius Priscus, the Roman governor of Thrace, managed to capture the city.

Decius and Herennius Etruscus launched a counterattack in spring 251 and were initially successful in pushing back the Goths. However, Cniva set an ambush for them, in June 251, near Abritus (modern-day Razgrad, Bulgaria). In this battle, both Decius and Herennius Etruscus were killed. The exact circumstances of the death of Herennius Etruscus are vague. The main source for the event, Aurelius Victor, says only that Herennius Etruscus was killed when he "pressed the attack too boldly". After the news of his death reached Decius, he refused to be consoled, stating that the loss of one life was minor to a battle, and thus continued the combat, in which he was also slain. The reserve forces of Trebonianus Gallus failed to reinforce the main army in time to save Decius and Herennius Etruscus, although whether this was due to treachery or misfortune is unknown.

After the death of both Decius and Herennius Etruscus, and much of the Roman army with them, the remaining forces immediately elected Trebonianus Gallus, the governor of Moesia, as emperor. Trebonianus Gallus made peace with Cniva on humiliating terms, allowing them to keep their prisoners and spoils in order to secure peace. After Trebonianus Gallus was overthrown by Aemilianus in 253, Herennia Etruscilla faded into obscurity.

References

Primary

Anonymous in their Epitome de Caesaribus. (29.3).
Aurelius Victor in his De Caesaribus (29.5).
Jordanes in his Getica (18.103).
Lucius Caecilius Firmianus Lactantius in his De Mortibus Persecutorum (4).
Zonaras in his Epitome Historiarum (12.20).

Citations

Bibliography

External links 

220s births
251 deaths
3rd-century Roman emperors
Year of birth uncertain
Imperial Roman consuls
Decian dynasty
Roman emperors killed in battle
Deaths by arrow wounds
Deified Roman emperors
Messii
Sons of Roman emperors
Illyrian emperors